Neolithodes yaldwyni is a species of king crab which is found in the Ross Sea from depths of . It had previously been misidentified as Neolithodes brodiei, and it closely resembles Neolithodes capensis.

Invasive species 
Neolithodes yaldwyni – along with Paralomis birsteini – are believed to be an invasive species, and there are fears that global warming could allow it to enter the Antarctic continental shelf within the coming decades and damage the ecosystem's native fauna. This hypothesis has been disputed.

Etymology 
"Neolithodes" is derived from Greek and Latin and means "new stone-crab", while "yaldwyni" is named after New Zealander carcinologist John Cameron Yaldwyn.

References

External links 
 

King crabs
Crustaceans described in 2006
Fauna of the Southern Ocean
Taxa named by Shane T. Ahyong